Dru Brown (born March 21, 1997) is an American gridiron football quarterback for the Winnipeg Blue Bombers of the Canadian Football League (CFL). He played college football at Oklahoma State and Hawaii.

College career 
Brown did not start until his senior season of high school and did not receive any Division I offers. He attended the College of San Mateo in his freshman year, playing in 11 games, and completed 104 of 194 passes for 1,870 yards and 21 touchdowns. He then transferred to Hawaii Rainbow Warriors for the 2016 season.

Hawaii

2016 
After not playing in Hawaii's first three games, Brown entered the Rainbow Warriors fourth game against the Arizona Wildcats in the second half, replacing Ikaika Woolsey. Brown was able to direct the Rainbow Warriors to three touchdown drives in the second half, but they lost to Arizona 47–28. He was named the starting quarterback before the Rainbow Warriors match against Nevada Wolf Pack. Against the Middle Tennessee Blue Raiders in the 2016 Hawaii Bowl, he threw for 274 yards and four touchdowns while also accounting for a rushing touchdown en route to a 52–35 victory. He was also named one of the game's most valuable player for his efforts.

2017 
Coming off of Hawaii's first bowl victory in ten years, Brown was once again named the starting quarterback for the 2017 season. He threw for 2,785 yards and 18 touchdowns that season on a struggling Rainbow Warriors team that lost nine of the last ten games, mostly attributed to a battered offensive line whose position coach left mid-way through the season, and top receiver John Ursua lost to a torn anterior cruciate ligament. After the 2017 season, he announced his intention to transfer, enrolled at Oklahoma State as a graduate transfer, and was immediately eligible to play. He finished his career at Hawaii with 5,273 career passing yards and 37 touchdowns.

Oklahoma State

2018 
At Oklahoma State, Brown joined a crowded QB room competing for the Cowboys starting quarterback job following the departure of the four-year starter Mason Rudolph. Brown was named the primary back-up quarterback to the starter Taylor Cornelius before the start of 2018 season. Despite playing in the Cowboys' 2018 Liberty Bowl, Brown was able to redshirt under the NCAA's new redshirt policy and keep his final year of eligibility.

2019 
Following Cornelius' graduation and departure, Brown was one of the favorites to win the starting quarterback job, competing for it with redshirt freshman Spencer Sanders. Brown was once again named the primary back-up as Sanders was named the starting quarterback for the Cowboys' season opener against the Oregon State Beavers.

After Sanders suffered a hand injury in the middle of a game against the Kansas Jayhawks, Brown entered the game in relief and threw a touchdown pass on his first play. He finished the game with 3 completions on 5 attempts for 70 yards and a touchdown in the 31–6 victory. He started his first career game as a Cowboy against the West Virginia Mountaineers the following week, where he racked up 196 yards and two touchdowns in a 20–13 victory. For his performance against West Virginia, he was named the Big 12 Newcomer of the Week.

Statistics

Professional career

Winnipeg Blue Bombers 
Following his college career, Brown was added to the Winnipeg Blue Bombers roster on March 11, 2020. During the first game of the 2022 Winnipeg Blue Bombers season, Brown came in to the game late in the fourth quarter to complete a game-winning field goal drive. He entered the game after starting quarterback Zach Collaros was pulled from play by injury spotters after he took a hit to the head.

References

External links 
 Winnipeg Blue Bombers bio
 Oklahoma State Cowboys bio
 Hawaii Rainbow Warriors bio

1997 births
Living people
Sportspeople from Palo Alto, California
American football quarterbacks
San Mateo Bulldogs football players
Hawaii Rainbow Warriors football players
University of Hawaiʻi at Mānoa alumni
Oklahoma State Cowboys football players
Winnipeg Blue Bombers players